The 2018 Porsche Tennis Grand Prix was a women's tennis tournament played on indoor clay courts. It was the 41st edition of the Porsche Tennis Grand Prix, and part of the Premier tournaments of the 2018 WTA Tour. It took place at the Porsche Arena in Stuttgart, Germany, from 23 to 29 April 2018.

Points and prize money

Point distribution

Prize money

* per team

Singles main draw entrants

Seeds

 1 Rankings are as of 16 April 2018.

Other entrants
The following players received wildcards into the main draw:
  Antonia Lottner
  Maria Sharapova
  Laura Siegemund
  CoCo Vandeweghe

The following players received entry from the qualifying draw:
  Zarina Diyas
  Marta Kostyuk
  Veronika Kudermetova 
  Markéta Vondroušová

The following player received entry as a lucky loser:
  Carina Witthöft

Withdrawals 
Before the tournament
  Anastasija Sevastova →replaced by  Carina Witthöft

Retirements
  Angelique Kerber
  Garbiñe Muguruza
  Markéta Vondroušová

Doubles main draw entrants

Seeds

1 Rankings as of April 16, 2018.

Other entrants
The following pair received a wildcard into the main draw:
  Antonia Lottner /  Lena Rüffer

Finals

Singles

  Karolína Plíšková defeated  CoCo Vandeweghe, 7–6(7–2), 6–4

Doubles

  Raquel Atawo  /  Anna-Lena Grönefeld defeated  Nicole Melichar /  Květa Peschke, 6–4, 6–7(5–7), [10–5]

References

External links
 

Porsche Tennis Grand Prix
Porsche Tennis Grand Prix
Porsche Tennis Grand Prix
2010s in Baden-Württemberg
Porsche Tennis Grand Prix
Porsch